Ato Tsegay Berhe Hadera is an Ethiopian politician who served as president of the Tigray Region from 2001 to 2010, after serving as vice-president of the regional state of Tigray for 10 years (from 1991 to 2001).
He also served as the vice-chairman of TPLF (Tigray People Liberation Front) from April 2001 until December 2010. He was succeeded in both positions by Ato Abay Weldu in December 2010 and September 2017.

References

Presidents of Tigray Region
Living people
1947 births
Place of birth missing (living people)
Tigray People's Liberation Front politicians